Astragalus nuttallii is a species of milkvetch known by the common name Nuttall's milkvetch. It is native to California and Baja California, where it grows in the sandy soils of coastal habitat. This is a perennial herb forming thick, tangled clumps of hairy to hairless stems up to a meter in length. The abundant leaves are up to 17 centimeters in length and made up of many oval-shaped leaflets. The inflorescence is a large, dense body of up to 125 flowers, each around 1 to 1.5 centimeters long. The flowers are dull cream-colored and sometimes purple-tinted. The fruit is an inflated legume pod up to 6 centimeters long which dries to a papery texture and contains many seeds in its single chamber. One variety of this species, the ocean bluff milkvetch (var. nuttallii) is endemic to the Central Coast of California.

External links
Jepson Manual Treatment
USDA Plants Profile
Photo gallery

nuttallii
Flora of Baja California
Flora of California
Flora without expected TNC conservation status